The 2008 Wigan Warriors season saw the club compete in Super League XIII as well as the 2008 Challenge Cup tournament.

Season Preview
Wigan will be looking to continue their return to the top of Super League after finishing 6th in 2007. During 2008 Wigan will continue to rebuild their squad under coach Brian Noble but they will have a new owner and chairman in Ian Lenagan from 1 December 2007 after Maurice Lindsay retired and Dave Whelan decided to sell the club.

Full squad

† Added to the squad for pre-season friendlies.
†† Added to the squad on 27 May 2008.
‡ Qualify as non-quota players because they were playing in the British Federation before they were 21 years of age.

Transfers

Transfer for 2008 (In)

Transfer for 2008 (Out)

2008 Loans (Out)

Fixtures/Results 

 † Wigan Warriors against Huddersfield Giants on 6 June 2008 was postponed due to resurfacing work at the JJB Stadium. The match was re-arranged for 25 July 2008.
 ‡ Match was originally due to take place at the JJB Stadium but the venue was changed due to the unavailability of the Stadium on that date.

Statistics

Staff
Management Board
President – Peter Higginbottom
Owner and chairman – Ian Lenagan
chief executive – Mick Hogan

Rugby
Performance director – Joe Lydon
Head coach – Brian Noble
Assistant coach – Phil Veivers
Strength & Conditioning Coach – Mike Forshaw
Reserve Team Coach – Shaun Wane
Academy Team Coach – John Pendlebury

References

External links 
 Official site
 Wigan RL 2008 Season on the Wigan RL Fansite.
 Wigan RL 2008 Reserve Team on the Wigan RL Fansite.
 Wigan RL 2008 Academy Team on the Wigan RL Fansite.
 Wigan-Warriors fan site

Wigan Warriors seasons
Wigan Warriors season